An algebraic character is a formal expression attached to a module in representation theory of semisimple Lie algebras that generalizes the character of a finite-dimensional representation and is analogous to the Harish-Chandra character of the representations of semisimple Lie groups.

Definition 
Suppose that  is a locally-finite weight module.
defined by the formula:
 
where the sum is taken over all weight spaces of the module

Example 
The algebraic character of the Verma module  with the highest weight  is given by the formula

 

with the product taken over the set of positive roots.

Properties 
Algebraic characters are defined for locally-finite weight modules and are additive, i.e. the character of a direct sum of modules is the sum of their characters. On the other hand, although one can define multiplication of the formal exponents by the formula  and extend it to their finite linear combinations by linearity, this does not make  into a ring, because of the possibility of formal infinite sums. Thus the product of algebraic characters is well defined only in restricted situations; for example, for the case of a highest weight module, or a finite-dimensional module. In good situations, the algebraic character is multiplicative, i.e., the character of the tensor product of two weight modules is the product of their characters.

Generalization 
Characters also can be defined almost verbatim for weight modules over a Kac–Moody or generalized Kac–Moody Lie algebra.

See also 
Algebraic representation
Weyl-Kac character formula

References

Lie algebras
Representation theory of Lie algebras